Tsaiorchis is a genus of flowering plants in the family Orchidaceae.

Taxonomy
Tsaiorchis is placed in the orchid subfamily Orchidoideae, tribe Orchideae, subtribe Orchidineae. The relationship between Tsaiorchis and the rest of the subtribe is as shown in the cladogram below.

Although Tsaiorchis was shown to be sister to an expanded genus Hemipilia, the two have significant differences. Hemipilia grows from tubers, Tsaiorchis has horizontally extending rhizomes. The detailed structure of the flowers is also different.

Species
Tsaiorchis contains the following species:
Tsaiorchis neottianthoides T.Tang & F.T.Wang
Tsaiorchis keiskeoides (Gagnep.) X.H.Jin, Schuit. & W.T.Jin

References

Orchideae
Orchideae genera
Taxonomy articles created by Polbot